The 1969 Manitoba general election was held on June 25, 1969 to elect Members of the Legislative Assembly (MLAs) of the Canadian province of Manitoba.  It was a watershed moment in the province's political history.  The social-democratic New Democratic Party emerged for the first time as the largest party in the legislature, winning 28 out of 57 seats.  The governing Progressive Conservative Party fell to 22, and the once-dominant Liberal Party fell to an historical low of five.  The Social Credit Party won one seat, and there was also one Independent elected.

Although the NDP had risen from third place to only one seat short of a majority, it was not clear what form the government would take in the days immediately following the election.  There were negotiations among the Liberals and Progressive Conservatives to form a minority coalition government, supported by the Social Credit and Independent members; under this scenario, former Liberal leader Gildas Molgat would have become Premier.  These plans came to nothing when Liberal MLA Laurent Desjardins announced that he would sit as a "Liberal Democrat" supporting the NDP, allowing the NDP to form government by one seat.  Edward Schreyer became the province's first social democratic Premier shortly thereafter.

The Manitoba NDP had a total election budget of $45,000.  Although very small by modern standards, this was the most the party had ever spent up to this time.

The Liberals had managed to remain as the Official Opposition for a decade after losing power in 1959. However, this would be the start of almost 20 years in the political wilderness; the party would not come close to governing again until winning opposition status in 1988.

Results

See also
 List of Manitoba political parties

Riding results

Party key:
PC:  Progressive Conservative Party of Manitoba 
L:  Manitoba Liberal Party 
NDP:  New Democratic Party of Manitoba 
SC:  Manitoba Social Credit Party 
Comm:  Communist Party of Canada - Manitoba 
Ind:  Independent

Arthur:
(incumbent)J. Douglas Watt (PC) 3133
John McRae (L) 1375
Raymond Jones (NDP) 980

Assiniboia:
(incumbent)Stephen Patrick (L) 2355
Bill Docking (PC) 2329
Curtis Nordman (NDP) 1466

Brandon East:
Leonard Evans (NDP) 3035
Emily Lyons (PC) 1962
Don Martin (L) 1194

Brandon West:
Edward McGill (PC) 2814
James M. Skinner (NDP) 2310
Terry Penton (L) 1796

Burrows:
(incumbent)Ben Hanuschak (NDP) 3418
Wasyl Michael Swystun (PC) 1317
Olga E. Lewicki (L) 751
Andrew Bileski (Comm) 323

Charleswood:
Arthur Moug (PC) 3401
Duncan Edmonds (L) 2361
John C. Hilgenga (NDP) 1325

Churchill:
Gordon Beard (Ind) 1151
Walter Perepeluk (L) 971
Andre Champagne (PC) 913
Wilf Hudson (NDP) 822

Crescentwood:
Cy Gonick (NDP) 2689
(incumbent)Gurney Evans (PC) 2416
Francis Creighton Muldoon (L) 1422

Dauphin:
Peter Burtniak (NDP) 2933
(incumbent)Stewart McLean (PC) 2892
Robert E. Sheldon (L) 620

Elmwood:
(incumbent)Russell Doern (NDP) 3803
Alan George Gardiner (PC) 1526
John Kozoriz (L) 1053

Emerson:
Gabriel Girard (PC) 2467
(incumbent)John Tanchak (L) 2014
Stephen Zaretski (NDP) 695
Jacob Wall (SC) 237

Flin Flon:
Thomas Barrow (NDP) 2045
(incumbent)Charles H. Witney (PC) 1675
Francis Jobin (L) 1276

Fort Garry:
Bud Sherman (PC) 3570
G. Grant Cosby (NDP) 2063
Richard Alan Wankling (L) 1936

Fort Rouge:
Inez Trueman (PC) 2750
Una Decter (NDP) 2446
Jane Sayler Heffelfinger (L) 1941

Gimli:
John Gottfried (NDP) 2159
Eric Stefanson (PC) 1936
Walter Griffin (L) 1663

Gladstone:
James Ferguson (PC) 3000
(incumbent)Nelson Shoemaker (L) 2583
Mary McIntosh (NDP) 1064

Inkster:
(incumbent)Sidney Green (NDP) 4001
Robert Armstrong (PC) 989
Gurzon Harvey (L) 661

Kildonan:
(incumbent)Peter Fox (NDP) 4589
Don Mills (PC) 1876
John Gugulyn (L) 851

Lac Du Bonnet:
(incumbent)Samuel Uskiw (NDP) 4060
(incumbent)Fred Klym (PC) 1267
Al Tymko (L) 806

Lakeside:
(incumbent)Harry Enns (PC) 2532 
Robert Bend (L) 2190

Logan:
William Jenkins (NDP) 3029
Samuel Minuk (PC) 871
Howard Ferguson (L) 679

Minnedosa:
(incumbent)Walter Weir (PC) 3525
Emile Roy Shellborn (NDP) 1713
Donald McNabb (L) 1028

Osborne:
Ian Turnbull (NDP) 3188
(incumbent)Obie Baizley (PC) 2565
Win Loewen (L) 965

Pembina:
George Henderson (PC) 2823
Kenneth John Draper (L) 1815
David Harms (SC) 521
Edith Alsop (NDP) 336

Portage la Prairie:
(incumbent)Gordon Johnston (L) 2451
Harvey Carmichael (PC) 2440
Sidney Coulthard (NDP) 1049

Radisson:
Harry Shafransky (NDP) 3707
Edward Joseph Albert Kotowich (L) 2284
Moreen Henderson (PC) 1054

Rhineland:
(incumbent)Jacob Froese (SC) 1981
Henry Hildebrand (PC) 1853
Willo Sterritt Forrester (L) 782
Jacob W. Heinrichs (NDP) 181

Riel:
(incumbent)Donald Craik (PC) 3125
James Edward Buchanan (NDP) 3096
Raymond Spence (L) 1423

River Heights:
(incumbent)Sidney Spivak (PC) 4623 
Mark Danzker (L) 1573
Jack Silverberg (NDP) 1051

Roblin:
(incumbent)J. Wally McKenzie (PC) 2579
(incumbent)Mike Kawchuk (NDP) 2448
J.R. Mitchell (L) 516

Rock Lake:
(incumbent)Henry Einarson (PC) 3064
Remi Engelbert DePape (L) 1818
Timothy Leonard (NDP) 763

Rossmere:
Edward Schreyer (NDP) 4089
David Wilfred Pekary (PC) 1746
Vern Breckman (L) 631
Stanley Copp (Ind) 238

Rupertsland:
Jean Allard (NDP) 1366
S. P. Berthelette (L) 1142
Paul Burelle (PC) 1026

St. Boniface:
(incumbent)Laurent Desjardins (L) 4210 
Kamil Michael Gajdosik (NDP) 2656
Maurice J. Arpin (PC) 1110

St. George:
Bill Uruski (NDP) 2284
(incumbent)Elman Guttormson (L) 1886
Joseph Schwartz (PC) 1169

St. James:
Al Mackling (NDP) 3642
(incumbent)Douglas Stanes (PC) 2676
Peter Moss (L) 1404

St. Johns:
(incumbent)Saul Cherniack (NDP) 3642
Joe Rozmus (PC) 1014
George Strewchuk (L) 736

St. Matthews:
Wally Johannson (NDP) 2974
(incumbent)Robert Steen (PC) 2217
Rudy Peters (L) 1119

Ste. Rose:
(incumbent)Gildas Molgat (L) 2247
Heinz Marohn (PC) 1198
Leon Hoefer (NDP) 754
Norma Oswald (SC) 313

Selkirk:
Howard Pawley (NDP) 3374
Robert Stefan Oliver (PC) 2054
George S. Sigurdson (L) 835
Thomas Norquay (Ind) 57

Seven Oaks:
(incumbent)Saul Miller (NDP) 4203
Daniel Abraham Yanofsky (PC) 1505
Evelyne Rosborough (L) 813

Souris-Killarney:
(incumbent)Malcolm Earl McKellar (PC) 3053
(incumbent)Edward Dow (L) 1982
Wayne Williams (NDP) 892

Springfield:
Rene Toupin (NDP) 2724
George Mulder (PC) 1551
Hector Bahuaud (L) 807

Sturgeon Creek:
Frank Johnston (PC) 2781
Robert Megill Chipman (L) 2251
Stanley J. Carter (NDP) 1251
William John Turner (Ind) 336
James Farrell (Ind) 238

Swan River:
(incumbent)James Bilton (PC) 1920
Alex Filuk (NDP) 1757
Jerry Webb (SC) 1252
Gordon Beaumont (L) 766

The Pas:
Ron McBryde (NDP) 1556
(incumbent)John Carroll (PC) 1361
Calvert D. Gibson (L) 963

Thompson:
(incumbent)Joseph Borowski (NDP) 2436
Thomas Farrell (PC) 1500
Maurice Desjardins (L) 843

Transcona:
(incumbent)Russ Paulley (NDP) 4614
Thelma Jean Opseth Call (L) 1488
Kenn Gunn-Walberg (PC) 1052

Virden:
(incumbent)Morris McGregor (PC) 2161
(incumbent)Earl Dawson (L) 1571
Ralph Rowan (NDP) 1531

Wellington:
(incumbent)Philip Petursson (NDP) 3260
William McGarva (PC) 1522
Thomas Bernes(L) 1035

Winnipeg Centre:
Bud Boyce (NDP) 2398
(incumbent)James Cowan (PC) 1451
Joseph Wapemoose (L) 822

Wolseley:
(incumbent)Leonard Claydon (PC) 2360
Hans J. Wittich (NDP) 1743
Paul N. Duval (L) 1391

Post-election changes

Jack Hardy (St. Vital, PC) resigned his seat.  A by-election was called for April 5, 1971.

Ste. Rose (res. Gildas Molgat, October 7, 1970), April 5, 1971:
Aime Adam (NDP) 2785
Fred Werbiski (L) 2118
John Borcher (PC) 1792

Minnedosa (res. Walter Weir, September 1971), November 16, 1971:
Dave Blake (PC) 3532
Emil Shellborn (NDP) 2348
Hugh Stephenson (L) 1129

Laurent Desjardins formally joined the NDP in 1971.

Wolseley (dec. Leonard Claydon, 1971), June 16, 1972:
Israel Asper (L) 3530
Ernie J. Enns (PC) 2271
Vic Schroeder (NDP) 2174
William Hawryluk (Ind) 45

Jean Allard left the NDP to sit as an Independent on April 7, 1972.  Joseph Borowski left the NDP caucus on June 25, 1972.

Churchill (dec. Gordon Beard, November 12, 1972)

References

Further reading
 

1969 elections in Canada
1969
1969 in Manitoba
June 1969 events in Canada